For the Last Time is a British music show where long-running established bands perform one last time before saying goodbye to their most loved fans as they split up for good. Episodes were presented by Christine Bleakley. Since the show has aired, both bands have reunited: Simply Red in 2015, and Westlife in 2018.

Episodes

References

2010s British music television series
2010 British television series debuts
2011 British television series endings
English-language television shows
ITV (TV network) original programming
Music television specials
Television series by ITV Studios